Our Hearts Were Growing Up is a 1946 American comedy film directed by William D. Russell and written by Melvin Frank, Norman Panama and Frank Waldman. It is the sequel to the 1944 film Our Hearts Were Young and Gay. The film stars Gail Russell, Diana Lynn, Brian Donlevy, Billy De Wolfe, James Brown and Bill Edwards. The film was released on June 16, 1946, by Paramount Pictures.

Plot

Cast 
Gail Russell as Cornelia Otis Skinner
Diana Lynn as Emily Kimbrough
Brian Donlevy as Tony Minnetti
Billy De Wolfe as Roland du Frere
James Brown as Avery Moore
Bill Edwards as Tom Newhall
William Demarest as Peanuts Schultz
Sharon Douglas as Suzanne Carter
Mary Hatcher as Dibs Downing
Sara Haden as Miss Dill
Mikhail Rasumny as Bubchenko
Isabel Randolph as Mrs. Southworth
Frank Faylen as Federal Agent

References

External links 
 

1946 films
1946 comedy films
American black-and-white films
American comedy films
American sequel films
Films directed by William D. Russell
Films set in Boston
Films set in the 1920s
Films set in universities and colleges
Paramount Pictures films
1946 directorial debut films
1940s English-language films
1940s American films